Halcyon Studios, LLC., formerly known as Sonar Entertainment, RHI Entertainment, Hallmark Entertainment, Qintex Entertainment, HRI Group and Robert Halmi Inc., is an American entertainment company specializing in the production and distribution of scripted television content, part of Chicken Soup for the Soul Entertainment. It was founded in 1979 by Robert Halmi Jr. and Robert Halmi Sr. (1924–2014) as Robert Halmi, Inc. The company uses the direct-to-series model for TV series.

History 
Robert Halmi Inc. was founded in 1979 by Robert Halmi Sr. In July 1986, Robert Halmi Jr. took over as president and chief operating officer from Halmi Sr., who became the company's chairman and chief executive. 

Hallmark Cards agreed to purchase RHI in April 1994. RHI had a 1,800 plus hours film library at that time. Then Hallmark Entertainment was formed with RHI and Signboard Hill Production, another Hallmark Cards subsidiary, becoming subsidiaries. Hallmark sold the Filmation library and its rights to Entertainment Rights in March 2004.

In December 2005, Hallmark Entertainment sold off its production arm to an investor group led by Robert Halmi Jr., it was renamed back to RHI Entertainment. 

In March 2012, the company was renamed Sonar Entertainment. The name change stemmed from the Halmis leaving the company. 

On April 9, 2021, Chicken Soup for the Soul Entertainment signed a definitive agreement to acquire Sonar's assets. 

On May 3, 2021, CSS announced it would launch Halcyon Television, a scripted television studio.

Notable works 
As Qintex Entertainment, the company co-produced the miniseries Lonesome Dove for CBS.

As of December 2017, Sonar Entertainment's scripted series on-air, in production or slated to commence production included Mr. Mercedes, written by David E. Kelley, based on the novel by Stephen King, with Audience Network for DIRECTV and AT&T U-Verse; Seasons 1 and 2 of The Son, starring Pierce Brosnan for AMC; Seasons 1 and 2 of The Shannara Chronicles, for Spike; and Das Boot, an eight-part series based on the film, for Sky.

References

External links 
 

Mass media companies established in 1979
American companies established in 1979
Entertainment companies of the United States
2021 mergers and acquisitions